Perumparambath Anthaf (born 23 March 1988) is an Indian cricketer who played 11 first-class matches for Kerala between 2010 and 2015. He made his first-class debut for Kerala on 8 December 2010 in the 2010-11 Ranji Trophy against Andhra Pradesh.

References

External links
 

1988 births
Living people
Indian cricketers
Kerala cricketers
People from Thrissur district
Cricketers from Kerala